President is a common title for the head of state in most republics. The president of a nation is, generally speaking, the head of the government and the fundamental leader of the country or the ceremonial head of state.

The functions exercised by a president vary according to the form of government. In parliamentary republics, they are usually, but not always, limited to those of the head of state and are thus largely ceremonial. In presidential, selected parliamentary (e.g. Botswana and South Africa), and semi-presidential republics, the role of the president is more prominent, encompassing also (in most cases) the functions of the head of government. In authoritarian regimes, a dictator or leader of a one-party state may also be called a president.

The titles "Mr. President" and Madam President may apply to a person holding the title of president or presiding over certain other governmental bodies. "Mr. President" has subsequently been used by governments to refer to their heads of state. It is the conventional translation of non-English titles such as Monsieur le Président for the president of the French Republic. It also has a long history of usage as the title of the presiding officers of legislative and judicial bodies. The speaker of the House of Commons of Canada is addressed as président de la Chambre des communes in French and as Mr. Speaker in English.

History

In the United States

The 1787 Constitution of the United States did not specify the manner of address for the president. When George Washington was sworn in as the first president of the United States on April 30, 1789, the administering of the oath of office ended with the proclamation: "Long live George Washington, President of the United States." No title other than the name of the office of the executive was officially used at the inauguration. The question of a presidential title was being debated in Congress at the time, however, having become official legislative business with Richard Henry Lee's motion of April 23, 1789. Lee's motion asked congress to consider "what titles it will be proper to annex to the offices of President and Vice President of the United Statesif any other than those given in the Constitution". Vice President John Adams, in his role as President of the United States Senate, organized a congressional committee. There Adams agitated for the adoption of the style of Highness (as well as the title of Protector of Their [the United States'] Liberties) for the President. Adams and Lee were among the most outspoken proponents of an exalted presidential title.

Others favored the variant of Electoral Highness or the lesser Excellency, the latter of which was vociferously opposed by Adams, who contended that it was far beneath the presidential dignity, as the executives of the states, some of which were also titled "President" (e.g. the President of Pennsylvania), at that time often enjoyed the style of Excellency; Adams said the president "would be leveled with colonial governors or with functionaries from German princedoms" if he were to use the style of Excellency. Adams and Richard Henry Lee both feared that cabals of powerful senators would unduly influence a weak executive, and saw an exalted title as a way of strengthening the presidency. On further consideration, Adams deemed even Highness insufficient and instead proposed that the executive, both the president and the vice president (i.e., himself), be styled Majesty to prevent the "great danger" of an executive with insufficient dignity. Adams' efforts were met with widespread derision and perplexion; Thomas Jefferson called them "the most superlatively ridiculous thing I ever heard of", while Benjamin Franklin considered it "absolutely mad".

Washington consented to the demands of James Madison and the United States House of Representatives that the title be altered to "Mr. President". Nonetheless, later "The Honorable" became the standard title of the President in formal address, and "His/Her Excellency" became the title of the President when addressed formally internationally.

Historically, the title was reserved for the incumbent president only, and was not to be used for former presidents, holding that it was not proper to use the title as a courtesy title when addressing a former president. According to the official website of the United States of America, the correct way to address a letter is to use "The Honorable John Doe" and the correct salutation is "Mr. Doe". 

In the United States, the title "Mr. President" is used in a number of formal instances as well: for example anyone presiding over the United States Senate is addressed as "Mr./Madam President", especially the Vice President, who is the President of the Senate. Other uses of the title include presidents of state and local legislatures, however only the president of the United States uses the title outside of formal sessions.

In other countries
Thomas Hungerford, who became the first speaker of the English House of Commons in 1376, used the title, "Mr. Speaker", a precedent followed by subsequent speakers of the House of Commons. This influenced parliamentary usage in France.

By the 18th century, the president of a French parlement was addressed as "Monsieur le Président". In Pierre Choderlos de Laclos's 1782 novel Les Liaisons Dangereuses ("Dangerous Liaisons"), the wife of a magistrate in a parlement is referred to as Madame la Présidente de Tourvel ("Madam President of Tourvel"). When the Second French Republic was established in 1848, "Monsieur le Président" became the title of the president of the French Republic.

The speaker of the House of Commons of Canada, established in 1867, is also addressed as "Monsieur le Président" or "Madame la Présidente" in French.

Description 
The title president is derived from the Latin prae- "before" + sedere "to sit". As such, it originally designated the officer who presides over or "sits before" a gathering and ensures that debate is conducted according to the rules of order (see also chairman and speaker), but today it most commonly refers to an executive official in any social organization. Early examples are from the universities of Oxford and Cambridge (from 1464) and the founding president of the Royal Society William Brouncker in 1660. This usage survives today in the title of such offices as "President of the Board of Trade" and "Lord President of the Council" in the United Kingdom, as well as "President of the Senate" in the United States (one of the roles constitutionally assigned to the vice president). The officiating priest at certain Anglican religious services, too, is sometimes called the "president" in this sense. However, the most common modern usage is as the title of a head of state in a republic.

In pre-revolutionary France, the president of a Parlement evolved into a powerful magistrate, a member of the so-called noblesse de robe ("nobility of the gown"), with considerable judicial as well as administrative authority. The name referred to his primary role of presiding over trials and other hearings. In the 17th and 18th centuries, seats in the Parlements, including presidencies, became effectively hereditary, since the holder of the office could ensure that it would pass to an heir by paying the crown a special tax known as the paulette. The post of "first president" (premier président), however, could be held by only the King's nominees. The Parlements were abolished by the French Revolution. In modern France the chief judge of a court is known as its president (président de la cour).

The word "presidents" is also used in the King James Bible at Daniel 6:2 to translate the Aramaic term סָרְכִ֣ין (sā·rə·ḵîn), a word of likely Persian origin, meaning "officials", "commissioners", "overseers" or "chiefs".

The first usage of the word president to denote the highest official in a government was during the Commonwealth of England. After the abolition of the monarchy the English Council of State, whose members were elected by the House of Commons, became the executive government of the Commonwealth. The Council of State was the successor of the Privy Council, which had previously been headed by the lord president; its successor the Council of State was also headed by a lord president, the first of which was John Bradshaw. However, the lord president alone was not head of state, because that office was vested in the council as a whole.

The modern usage of the term president to designate a single person who is the head of state of a republic can be traced directly to the United States Constitution of 1787, which created the office of President of the United States. Previous American governments had included "presidents" (such as the president of the Continental Congress or the president of the Massachusetts Provincial Congress), but these were presiding officers in the older sense, with no executive authority. It has been suggested that the executive use of the term was borrowed from early American colleges and universities, which were usually headed by a president. British universities were headed by an official called the "Chancellor" (typically a ceremonial position) while the chief administrator held the title of "Vice-Chancellor". But America's first institutions of higher learning (such as Harvard University and Yale University) didn't resemble a full-sized university so much as one of its constituent colleges. A number of colleges at Cambridge University featured an official called the "president". The head, for instance, of Magdalene College, Cambridge was called the master and his second the president. The first president of Harvard, Henry Dunster, had been educated at Magdalene. Some have speculated that he borrowed the term out of a sense of humility, considering himself only a temporary place-holder. The presiding official of Yale College, originally a "rector" (after the usage of continental European universities), became "president" in 1745.

A common style of address for presidents, Mr/Mrs. President", is borrowed from British Parliamentary tradition, in which the presiding Speaker of the House of Commons is referred to as "Mr/Mrs. Speaker". Coincidentally, this usage resembles the older French custom of referring to the president of a parlement as "Monsieur/Madame le Président", a form of address that in modern France applies to both the president of the Republic and to chief judges. Similarly, the Speaker of the House of Commons of Canada is addressed by francophone parliamentarians as "Monsieur/Madame le/la Président(e)". In Pierre Choderlos de Laclos's novel Les Liaisons Dangereuses of 1782, the character identified as Madame la Présidente de Tourvel ("Madam President of Tourvel") is the wife of a magistrate in a parlement. The fictional name Tourvel refers not to the parlement in which the magistrate sits, but rather, in imitation of an aristocratic title, to his private estate.

Once the United States adopted the title of "president" for its republican head of state, many other nations followed suit. Haiti became the first presidential republic in Latin America when Henri Christophe assumed the title in 1807. Almost all the American nations that became independent from Spain in the early 1810s and 1820s chose a US-style president as their chief executive. The first European president was the president of the Italian Republic of 1802, a client state of revolutionary France, in the person of Napoleon Bonaparte. The first African president was the president of Liberia (1848), while the first Asian president was the president of the Republic of China (1912).

In the twentieth and twenty-first centuries, the powers of presidencies have varied from country to country. The spectrum of power has included presidents-for-life and hereditary presidencies to ceremonial heads of state.

Presidents in the countries with a democratic or representative form of government are usually elected for a specified period of time and in some cases may be re-elected by the same process by which they are appointed, i.e. in many nations, periodic popular elections. The powers vested in such presidents vary considerably. Some presidencies, such as that of Ireland, are largely ceremonial, whereas other systems vest the president with substantive powers such as the appointment and dismissal of prime ministers or cabinets, the power to declare war, and powers of veto on legislation. In many nations the president is also the commander-in-chief of the nation's armed forces, though once again this can range from a ceremonial role to one with considerable authority.

Presidential systems

In almost all states with a presidential system of government, the president exercises the functions of head of state and head of government, i.e. the president directs the executive branch of government. When a president is not only head of state, but also head of government, this is known in Europe as a President of the Council (from the French Président du Conseil), used 1871–1940 and 1944–1958 in the Third and Fourth French Republics. In the United States the president has always been both Head of State and Head of Government and has always had the title of President.

Presidents in this system are either directly elected by popular vote or indirectly elected by an electoral college or some other democratically elected body.

In the United States, the president is indirectly elected by the Electoral College made up of electors chosen by voters in the presidential election. In most states of the United States, each elector is committed to voting for a specified candidate determined by the popular vote in each state, so that the people, in voting for each elector, are in effect voting for the candidate. However, for various reasons the numbers of electors in favour of each candidate are unlikely to be proportional to the popular vote. Thus, in five close United States elections (1824, 1876, 1888, 2000, and 2016), the candidate with the most popular votes still lost the election.

In Mexico, the president is directly elected for a six-year term by popular vote. The candidate who wins the most votes is elected president even without an absolute majority. The president is allowed to serve only one term.

In Brazil, the president is directly elected for a four-year term by popular vote. A candidate has to have more than 50% of the valid votes. If no candidates achieve a majority of the votes, there is a runoff election between the two candidates with most votes. Again, a candidate needs a majority of the vote to be elected. In Brazil, a president cannot be elected to more than two consecutive terms, but there is no limit on the number of terms a president can serve.

Many South American, Central American, African and some Asian nations follow the presidential model.

Semi-presidential systems

A second system is the semi-presidential system, also known as the French model. In this system, as in the parliamentary system, there are both a president and a prime minister; but unlike the parliamentary system, the president may have significant day-to-day power. For example, in France, when their party controls the majority of seats in the National Assembly, the president can operate closely with the parliament and prime minister, and work towards a common agenda. When the National Assembly is controlled by their opponents, however, the president can find themselves marginalized with the opposition party prime minister exercising most of the power. Though the prime minister remains an appointee of the president, the president must obey the rules of parliament, and select a leader from the house's majority holding party. Thus, sometimes the president and prime minister can be allies, sometimes rivals; the latter situation is known in France as cohabitation. Variants of the French semi-presidential system, developed at the beginning of the Fifth Republic by Charles de Gaulle, are used in France, Portugal, Romania, Sri Lanka and several post-colonial countries which have emulated the French model. In Finland, although the 2000 constitution moved towards a ceremonial presidency, the system is still formally semi-presidential, with the president of Finland retaining e.g. foreign policy and appointment powers.

Parliamentary republics

The parliamentary republic, is a parliamentary system in which the presidency is largely ceremonial with either de facto or no significant executive authority (such as the president of Austria) or de jure no significant executive power (such as the president of Ireland), and the executive powers rests with the prime minister who automatically assumes the post as head of a majority party or coalition, but takes oath of office administered by the president. However, the president is head of the civil service, commander in chief of the armed forces and in some cases can dissolve parliament. Countries using this system include Austria, Armenia, Albania, Bangladesh, Czech Republic, Germany, Greece, Hungary, Iceland, India, Ireland, Israel, Italy, Malta, Pakistan, and Singapore.

A variation of the parliamentary republic is a system with an executive president in which the president is the head of state and the government but unlike a presidential system, is elected by and accountable to a parliament, and referred to as president. Countries using this system include Botswana, Nauru and South Africa.

Dictatorships

In dictatorships, the title of president is frequently taken by self-appointed or military-backed leaders. Such is the case in many states: Idi Amin in Uganda, Mobutu Sese Seko in Zaire, Ferdinand Marcos in the Philippines, Suharto in Indonesia, and Saddam Hussein in Iraq are some examples. Other presidents in authoritarian states have wielded only symbolic or no power such as Craveiro Lopes in Portugal and Joaquín Balaguer under the "Trujillo Era" of the Dominican Republic.

President for Life is a title assumed by some dictators to try to ensure their authority or legitimacy is never questioned. Presidents like Alexandre Pétion, Rafael Carrera, Josip Broz Tito and François Duvalier died in office. Kim Il-sung was named Eternal President of the Republic after his death.

Collective presidency

Only a tiny minority of modern republics do not have a single head of state. Some examples of this are:
 Switzerland, where the headship of state is collectively vested in the seven-member Swiss Federal Council, although there is also a president of the Confederation, who is a member of the Federal Council elected by the Federal Assembly (the Swiss parliament) for a year (constitutional convention mandates that the post rotates every New Year's Day).
 The Captains Regent of San Marino elected by the Grand and General Council.
 In the former Soviet Union from 1922 until 1938 there existed an office of collective head of state known as the Central Executive Committee of the Soviet Union that consisted of four and later seven chairmen representing the central executive committees of all union republics from Russia, Belarus, Ukraine, Trans-Caucasusia and from 1925 Uzbekistan, Turkmenistan, Tajikistan. From 1927 until 1989 however, real power was exercised by the General Secretary of the Soviet Communist Party. After 1938, the Presidium of the Supreme Soviet executed powers of a collective head of state, and its chairman was often called "president" in the West, though a singular head of state named "president" was later established in 1990.
 Yugoslavia after the death of Josip Broz Tito, where a presidency consisting of members from each federal unit ruled the country until its breakup.
 Ukraine, in 1918–1920 there existed Directorate composed of seven leaders of parliamentary factions and served as a collective head of state.
 The three-member Presidency of Bosnia and Herzegovina contains a member from each of the country's largest ethnic groups and serves as the collective head of state of Bosnia and Herzegovina
 National Council of Government in Uruguay from 1952 until 1967
 Junta of National Reconstruction in Nicaragua from 1979 until 1985

One-party states 
The President of China is the head of state of the People's Republic of China. Under the country's constitution, the presidency is a largely ceremonial office with limited power. However, since 1993, as a matter of convention, the presidency has been held simultaneously by the General Secretary of the Chinese Communist Party, the top leader in the single-party system.

In China between 1982 and 2018, the constitution stipulated that the president could not serve more than two consecutive terms. During the Mao era and also since 2018, there were no term limits attached to this office. In 2018, the term limits of the presidency were abolished, but its powers and ceremonial role were unchanged.

Presidential symbols 
As the country's head of state, in most countries the president is entitled to certain perquisites, and may have a prestigious residence, often a lavish mansion or palace, sometimes more than one (e.g. summer and winter residences, or a country retreat) Customary symbols of office may include an official uniform, decorations, a presidential seal, coat of arms, flag and other visible accessories, as well as military honours such as gun salutes, ruffles and flourishes, and a presidential guard. A common presidential symbol is the presidential sash worn most often by presidents in Latin America and Africa as a symbol of the continuity of the office.

Presidential chronologies 

United Nations member countries in columns, other entities at the beginning:
 European Commission
 List of presidents of European Union institutions
 List of presidents of the Soviet Union (Leaders)

Titles for non-heads of state

As head of government 
Some countries with parliamentary systems use a term meaning/translating as "president" (in some languages indistinguishable from chairman) for the head of parliamentary government, often as President of the Government, President of the Council of Ministers or President of the Executive Council.

However, such an official is explicitly not the president of the country. These officials are called "president" using an older sense of the word, to denote the fact that the official heads the cabinet. A separate head of state generally exists in their country who instead serves as the president or monarch of the country.

Thus, such officials are really premiers, and to avoid confusion are often described simply as 'prime minister' when being mentioned internationally.

There are several examples for this kind of presidency:
 The Prime Minister of Spain is officially referred to as the president of the Government of Spain, and informally known as the "president". Spain is also a kingdom with a reigning king.
 The official title of the Italian Prime Minister is President of the Council of Ministers (Italian Presidente del Consiglio dei Ministri)
 Under the French Third and the Fourth Republics, the "President of the Council" (of ministersa prime minister) was the head of government, with the President of the Republic a largely symbolic figurehead.
 From 1963 until 1992, the head of government of the Socialist Federal Republic of Yugoslavia was the President of the Federal Executive Council after the 1963 Constitution abolished the office of Prime Minister of Yugoslavia and transferred its functions to the President of the Federal Executive Council. Despite this, foreign media sources continued to refer to individuals holding the office of President of the Federal Executive Council as being the "Prime Minister of Yugoslavia".
 The Prime minister of the Irish Free State from 1922 to 1937 was titled President of the Executive Council of the Irish Free State. At the same time, the Irish Free State was a constitutional monarchy with a reigning monarch, the King of Ireland, as well as a resident Governor-General carrying out many head of state functions.
 Under the constitutional monarchies of Brazil and Portugal, the president of the Council of Ministers (Portuguese Presidente do Conselho de Ministros) was the head of government, with the Monarch being the head of State. Under the Portuguese First and Second Republics, the head of government was the president of the Ministry (Portuguese Presidente do Ministério) and then the president of the Council of Ministers, with the president of the Republic as the head of State.
 The official title of the Croatian prime minister is President of the Government of the Republic of Croatia.
 The official title of the Polish prime minister is President of the Council of Ministers (Polish Prezes Rady Ministrów).
 In British constitutional practice, the chairman of an Executive Council, acting in such a capacity, is known as a president of the Executive Council. Usually this person is the Governor and it always stays like that.
 Between 1918 and 1934, Estonia had no separate head of state. Both prime ministers (1918–1920) and state elders (1920–1934) often translated as "presidents") were elected by the parliament.
The head of government of Iran is styled as the "President". The Iranian head of state is the Supreme Leader, to whom the president is subordinate.

Other executive positions

Sub-national 
President can also be the title of the chief executive at a lower administrative level, such as the parish presidents of the parishes of the U.S. state of Louisiana, the presiding member of city council for villages in the U.S. state of Illinois, or the municipal presidents of Mexico's municipalities. Perhaps the best known sub-national presidents are the borough presidents of the five boroughs of New York City.

Poland
In Poland the President of the City is the executive authority of the municipality elected in direct elections, the equivalent of the mayor. The Office of the President (Mayor) is also found in Germany and Switzerland.

Russia
Governors of ethnic republics in the Russian Federation used to have the title of President, occasionally alongside other, secondary titles such as Chairman of the Government (also used by Prime Minister of Russia). This likely reflects the origin of Russian republics as homelands for various ethnic groups: while all federal subjects of Russia are currently de jure equal, their predecessors, the ASSRs, used to enjoy more privileges than the ordinary krais and oblasts of the RSFSR (such as greater representation in the Soviet of Nationalities). Thus, the ASSRs and their eventual successors would have more in common with nation-states than with ordinary administrative divisions, at least in spirit, and would choose titles accordingly.

Over the course of the 2010s the presidents of Russian republics would progressively change their title to that of Head, a proposition suggested by the president of Chechnya Ramzan Kadyrov and later made law by the Parliament of Russia and President Dmitriy Medvedev in 2010. Despite this, however, presidents of Tatarstan would reject this change and, as of 2017, retain their title in defiance of Russian law. The new title did not result in any changes in the powers wielded by the governors.

United Kingdom
The lord president of the Council is one of the Great Officers of State in the United Kingdom who presides over meetings of British Privy Council; the Cabinet headed by the prime minister is technically a committee of the Council, and all decisions of the Cabinet are formally approved through Orders in Council. Although the lord president is a member of the Cabinet, the position is largely a ceremonial one and is traditionally given to either the leader of the House of Commons or the leader of the House of Lords.

Historically the president of the Board of Trade was a cabinet member.

Dependencies
In Alderney, the elected head of government is called the president of the States of Alderney.

In the Isle of Man, there is a president of Tynwald.

Spain
In Spain, the executive leaders of the autonomous communities (regions) are called presidents. In each community, they can be called Presidente de la Comunidad or Presidente del Consejo among others. They are elected by their respective regional assemblies and have similar powers to a state president or governor.

Deputies
Below a president, there can be a number of or "vice presidents" (or occasionally "deputy presidents") and sometimes several "assistant presidents" or "assistant vice presidents", depending on the organisation and its size. These posts do not hold the same power but more of a subordinate position to the president. However, power can be transferred in special circumstances to the deputy or vice president. Normally vice presidents hold some power and special responsibilities below that of the president. The difference between vice/deputy presidents and assistant/associate vice presidents is the former are legally allowed to run an organisation, exercising the same powers (as well as being second in command) whereas the latter are not.

Legislatures
In some countries the speaker of their unicameral legislatures, or of one or both houses of bicameral legislatures, the speakers have the title of president of "the body", as in the case of Spain, where the Speaker of the Congress is the president of the Congress of Deputies and the Speaker of the Senate is the president of the Senate.

Judiciary
The term 'President' is usually used in judiciary as chief justice of constitutional courts.

France
In French legal terminology, the president of a court consisting of multiple judges is the foremost judge; he chairs the meeting of the court and directs the debates (and is thus addressed as "Mrs President", "Madame la Présidente", "Mr President", or Monsieur le Président. In general, a court comprises several chambers, each with its own president; thus the most senior of these is called the "first president" (as in: "the First President of the Court of Cassation is the most senior judge in France"). Similarly in English legal practice the most senior judge in each division uses this title (e.g. President of the Family Division, President of the Court of Appeal).

Spain
In the Spanish Judiciary, the leader of a court of multiples judges is called President of the Court. The same happens with the different bodies of the Spanish judicial system, where we can find a president of the Supreme Court, a president of the National Court and presidents in the Regional High Courts of Justice and in the Provincial Courts. The body that rules over the Judiciary in Spain is the General Council of the Judiciary, and its president is the president of the Supreme Court, which is normally called President of the Supreme Court and of the GCJ.

The Constitutional Court is not part of the Judiciary, but the leader of it is called President of the Constitutional Court.

United Kingdom
In the recently established Supreme Court of the United Kingdom, the most senior judge is called the president of the Supreme Court. The lady/lord president of the Court of Session is head of the judiciary in Scotland, and presiding judge (and Senator) of the College of Justice and Court of Session, as well as being Lady/Lord Justice General of Scotland and head of the High Court of Justiciary, the offices having been combined in 1784.

Spousal or female titles

Titles for a president's spouse, if female, have ranged from "Marquise" to "Lady" to simply "Mrs." (or "Ms."). If male the title of the president's spouse may be "Marquis", "Lord", or merely "Mr.".

United States
President George Washington's wife, Martha Washington, was often called "Lady Washington". By the 1850s in the United States, the term "lady" had changed from a title of nobility to a term of address for a respected and well-mannered woman. The use of "First Lady" to refer to the wife of the president of the United States was popularized about the time of the US Civil War. Dolley Madison, the wife of President James Madison, was remembered after her death in 1849 by President Zachary Taylor as "truly our First Lady for a half a century". First ladies are usually referred to simply as "Mrs. [last name]"

In the media 
On 8 November 2016, the night of the 2016 presidential election in the United States, images of leaked pre-printed copies of Newsweek magazine showed the magazine celebrating the win of the Democratic candidate Hillary Clinton, with the cover titled "Madam President". It is common for Newsweek to prepare for the eventuality of either candidate winning, though it was unusual that it was both published and distributed; the cover was pulled from newsstands after it became clear that Donald Trump had secured a majority of electoral votes, winning the election.

See also 
 Eternal President of the Republic
 Presidential system
 Presidents Day
 Requirements for becoming a president
 Vice president
 First Lady

Head of state
 Governor-General
 Head of state
 List of state leaders
 Monarch
 Supreme Leader

Other head of government
 Minister-President (a head of government, not of state)
 Prime minister

References

Presidents
Heads of state
Positions of authority
Titles
Etymologies
English words